The NRS social grades are a system of demographic classification used in the United Kingdom. They were originally developed by the National Readership Survey (NRS) to classify readers, but are now used by many other organisations for wider applications and have become a standard for market research. They were developed in the late 1950s and refined in following years and achieved widespread usage in 20th century Britain. Their definition is now maintained by the Market Research Society.

The distinguishing feature of the NRS social grade is that it is based on occupation, rather than wealth or property ownership.

Grades

The classifications are based on the occupation of the head of the household.

The grades are often grouped into ABC1 and C2DE; these are taken to equate to middle class and working class, respectively. Only around 2% of the UK population is identified as upper class, and this group is not separated by the classification scheme.

See also
Acorn (demographics)
National Statistics Socio-economic Classification
Social class
Socioeconomic status

References

External links

National Readership Survey information on social grade and its discriminatory power 
MORI information on the grades
Demographic classifications

Demographics of the United Kingdom
Social class in the United Kingdom
Socio-economic mobility